Schumacher Society may refer to:

 Schumacher Center for a New Economics, an American society originally called the E. F. Schumacher Society
 Schumacher Society (UK), see New Economics Foundation

See also
 E. F. Schumacher